Pierre Pichette (January 27, 1954 – March 16, 2022) was a Canadian sledge hockey player. He won medals with Team Canada at the 1994 Winter Paralympics and 1998 Winter Paralympics. He also played in the 2002 Winter Paralympics.

References

1954 births
2022 deaths
Canadian sledge hockey players
Ice sledge hockey players at the 1994 Winter Paralympics
Ice sledge hockey players at the 1998 Winter Paralympics
Medalists at the 1994 Winter Paralympics
Medalists at the 1998 Winter Paralympics
Paralympic bronze medalists for Canada
Paralympic medalists in sledge hockey
Paralympic silver medalists for Canada
Paralympic sledge hockey players of Canada
People from Lachine, Quebec
Sportspeople from Montreal